Tapsel (Tapsels, Tapseel, Topseile, Taffechella, Tafficila) was a coarse cotton and silk cloth. It was a woven variety with a striped pattern, and usually a blue color. The fabric dated back to the 18th century and was made in western India.

See also 

 Sussi (cloth)

References 

Woven fabrics